St. Jadwiga's Basilica is a church located in Legnickie Pole, Lower Silesian Voivodeship in Poland. The church hosts the Parish of the Holy Cross and St. Jadwiga and is the central element of the there-founded Monastery of the Order of Saint Benedict.

References

Legnica County
Legnickie Pole